Roy Greenwood (22 May 1931 – 31 December 2011) was an English  professional footballer who played as a left back.

Career
Born in Croydon, Greenwood made 111 appearances in the Football League for Crystal Palace. He also played non-league football for Beckenham Town and Bedford Town.

Later life and death
Greenwood died in a Caterham nursing home on 31 December 2011, at the age of 80.

References

1931 births
2011 deaths
English footballers
Beckenham Town F.C. players
Crystal Palace F.C. players
Bedford Town F.C. players
English Football League players
Association football fullbacks
Footballers from Croydon